"Wild Week-End" is a single by American country music artist Bill Anderson. Released in March 1968, it was the first single from his album Wild Weekend. The song peaked at number 2 on the Billboard Hot Country Singles chart. It also reached number 1 on the RPM Country Tracks chart in Canada.

Chart performance

References

1968 singles
Bill Anderson (singer) songs
Songs written by Bill Anderson (singer)
1968 songs
Decca Records singles